Bình Long is a rural commune (xã) and village of the Châu Phú District of An Giang Province, Vietnam.

Communes of An Giang province
Populated places in An Giang province